Esmaeil Sedigh is an Iranian futsal coach and instructor based in the Philippines. He was a former football player in U21 1st division in Iran.

He has held the position of futsal department director under the Philippine Football Federation. Sedigh is known for his contributions in the development of Philippines national futsal team.

Coaching background 
He started as an assistant futsal coach in 2005, and the head coach of the Philippines from 2007 until 2012. During his coaching stint in the international arena, he has led Philippines to final round of the 2007 AFC Futsal Championship in Osaka, Japan after qualifying round in Taipei. He also led the team to 4th place in the AFF Futsal Championship 2009 and 2010.

Futsal instructor 
He had held several futsal coaching courses all over the Philippines under the Philippine Football Federation (PFF) and AFC level 1 futsal coaching course under the Asian Football Confederation (AFC).

Local futsal competitions 
He initiated the inclusion of Futsal Sports in the Philippine National Games (since 2011), Batang Pinoy Youth Games (since 2013) and the more recent Palarong Pambansa (as demo sports 2013), Organized and Sponsored by the Philippine Sports Commission (PSC), Philippine Olympic Committee (POC) and Department of Education (DepEd).

Cups and Leagues 
Sedigh founded the Philippine Futsal League.

References 

Living people
Iranian footballers
Iranian men's futsal players
Iranian futsal coaches
Iranian expatriate sportspeople in the Philippines
Association footballers not categorized by position
Year of birth missing (living people)